The Carpenters (a.k.a. Carpenters: Live at the BBC) is a videotaped studio concert performed by the Carpenters in 1971.

The artists lip-synched some tunes, such as "Help!" and the Burt Bacharach Medley, but most of the songs on the BBC Concert were performed 'live'. It was recorded on September 25 and aired on BBC1 on November 6, 1971. VH-1 has televised the concert for American audiences, however in order to fit it into a half-hour time slot with commercials, they omitted "And When He Smiles", "I Fell in Love with You", "That on the Road Look", and "Lust for Earl and the Married Woman". In addition to singing, Karen also plays the drums during some of the songs.

Track listing
"Help!" (pre-recorded)
"Love Is Surrender"
"Superstar"
"And When He Smiles"
"Rainy Days and Mondays"
"That on the Road Look" (Tony Joe White)
"I Fell in Love with You" (Karen Carpenter and Doug Strawn)
"Bacharach/David Medley" (pre-recorded)
"For All We Know"
"Lust for Earl and the Married Woman" (Tony Joe White)
"Sometimes"
"(They Long to Be) Close to You"
"We've Only Just Begun"

1971 television specials
Concert films
The Carpenters